

European Technology Platform on Smart Systems Integration (EPoSS e. V.) 
The European Technology Platform on Smart Systems Integration (EPoSS) is a European Seventh Framework Programme initiative to improve the competitive situation of the European Union in the field of Smart Systems Technologies and integrated Micro and Nanosystems.

The programme is a joint initiative (Public-Private Partnership) of the European Commission, representing the European Communities, and the industry.

EPoSS, the European Technology Platform on Smart Systems Integration, is an industry-driven policy initiative, defining R&D and innovation needs as well as policy requirements related to Smart Systems Integration and integrated Micro- and Nanosystems.

EPoSS is an international non-profit association according to German law. The EPoSS Association was founded on 18 September 2013. Its structure consists of Board, General Assembly, Executive Committee, Working Groups and Office (EPoSS structure).

A group of major industrial companies and research organisations (EPoSS Members) from more than 20 European Member States intend to co-ordinate their activities in the field of Smart Systems Integration. A main objective is to develop a vision and to set up a Strategic Research Agenda (SRA).

EPoSS brings together European private and public stakeholders in order to create an enduring basis for structuring initiatives, for co-ordinating and bundling efforts, for setting up sustainable structures of a European Research Area on Smart Systems Integration. EPoSS embraces all key players, public and private, in the value chain so as to:

 provide a common European approach on Innovative Smart Systems Integration from research to production, outlining the key issues for a strategic European innovation process,
 define priorities for common research and innovation in the future,
 formulate commonly agreed road maps for action (updating, assembling and completing existing material and approaches) and provide a strategic R&D agenda, and
 mobilise public and private human, infrastructural and financial resources.

The initiative is of immediate importance in view of defining research and technology priorities for the EU Framework Programme for Research and Innovation, for raising more critical mass as well as resources and for coordinating different initiatives (national, regional, EUREKA, European public funding and industry).

EPoSS is a strategic partner of the European Platform for Sport Innovation.

Smart Systems and Smart Systems Integration 
Smart Systems affect many aspects of our lives. They are bringing a new generation of diagnostic instruments to clinics. They are bringing innovative automatic safety systems to cars and public transport. They are becoming embedded into consumer goods, into the networks that power and inform society, and they are underpinning the efficient provision of public and private services. Increasingly they sense their surroundings, operate autonomously and collaborate with other Smart Systems.

Smart technologies promise to break the “faster, smaller, cheaper” circle that has for decades now characterised hi-tech commerce and forced the migration of commodity manufacture towards low-cost economies. The reason for this potential break is that Smart Systems extract and condense human skills and knowledge to add not only functionality but also value to products: value that is the skill, knowledge and has historically been the genius of European culture.

A smart medical diagnostic stand-alone instrument encapsulates the skills and expertise of a whole laboratory to provide value far in excess of its component parts. Likewise smart safety systems and smart networks deliver a broad range of expertise, care and attention continuously, tirelessly and invisible to the user.

Smart Systems Integration is an assembly of technologies that build products from components, that combine functions in products and systems, that connect and network systems to other systems, and, importantly, enable systems to receive and store a “knowledge base” – the software that makes them “Smart”.

Bringing this set of technologies together is far more ambitious than the “faster, smaller, cheaper” objectives of the past. It needs a concerted effort from education and on through research and development, product design and manufacture, all the way to the development of new business models and markets: a whole “Ecosystem” to nurture competitive advantage for the European Smart Systems community.

EPoSS SRA 
The connection between Smart Systems and the many application sectors they serve has been emphasized in the Strategic Research Agendas of EPoSS.

Smart Systems combine cognitive functions with sensing, actuation, data communication and energy management in an integrated way. The enabling principles of these functions include nanoelectronics, micro-electromechanics, magnetism, photonics, chemistry and radiation.

Smart systems are often integrated into the (natural, built and social) environment, networks for power and data and other smart systems. It is a sufficient (or extrinsic) condition for the smartness of a system to provide (and use) cognitive support to (and from) its surroundings.

The EPoSS SRA is a reference document that provides an executive review of the main issues around Smart Systems, then continues with ten self-contained “Mini SRAs” describing the particular issues, prospects, timescales and research priorities of seven application sectors and three cross-sector domains.

The seven applications sectors are Transport & Mobility; Health & Beyond; Manufacturing / Factory Automation; Communications; Energy; Aerospace; Smart Systems for the Environment. The three cross-sector domains are Safety, Security & Reliability; Technologies Supporting Smart Systems; and Production Processes for Smart Systems.

SSI Trademark 
EPoSS is an owner of the SSI Trademark: Smart Systems Integrated® is a Collective European Union Trademark, according to Council Regulation (EC) no.207/2009. It is valid for ten years and may be renewed. It has been registered by the EPoSS Association which has been its owner since 2017.

Smart Systems Integrated® concerns Smart Systems Technologies or innovative products integrating Smart Systems (Smart Systems Products) updated according to the EPoSS SRA.

See also
 European Technology Platform
 Joint Technology Initiative

References

 Interrelation between ICT ETPs
 EPoSS (speech)
Akhras, G., "Smart Materials and Smart Systems for the Future", Canadian Military Journal, 08/2000

Internet-of-Things in 2020 – A roadmap for the future, 2008 

Electronic Components and Systems, Strategic Research Agenda 2018 (ECS-SRA)

External links
European Technology Platform on Smart Systems Integration

Science and technology in Europe
European Union and science and technology